The 2010–11 Utah Jazz season was the 32nd season of the franchise in Salt Lake City, and the 37th overall in the National Basketball Association (NBA). The Jazz started off the season strong, posting a 15–5 start to the season. Following a 121–99 routing of the Cleveland Cavaliers, the Jazz peaked in mid-January with a 27–13 record, the fourth-best record in the Western Conference at the time. However, on February 10, legendary Jazz head coach Jerry Sloan and longtime assistant Phil Johnson both resigned; Tyrone Corbin was named the new head coach. Soon after the All-Star break was ended, on February 23, the Jazz traded star player Deron Williams to the New Jersey Nets for two first round draft picks (New Jersey's 2011 and Golden State's conditional 2012) and players, rookie Derrick Favors and former All-Star Devin Harris. The Jazz would post an 8–17 record after All-Star break, including an 8–game losing streak between March 20 to April 3, and end the season with a losing 39–43 record, six games back on the 8th–seeded Memphis Grizzles. In doing so, the Jazz became the first team in NBA history to start 27–13, and failed to make the playoffs.

Key dates
 June 24 –  The 2010 NBA draft was held in New York City.
 July 1 – The free agency period began.

Summary

NBA Draft 2010

Free agency

Draft picks

Roster

Pre-season

Game log

|- bgcolor="#ccffcc"
| 1
| October 7
| Portland
| 
| Deron Williams (15)
| Paul Millsap (8)
| Deron Williams (5)
| EnergySolutions Arena19,492
| 1–0
|- bgcolor="#ccffcc"
| 2
| October 11
| @ Portland
| 
| Kyrylo Fesenko (18)
| Kyrylo Fesenko (7)
| Deron Williams (4)
| Portland Memorial Coliseum10,651
| 2–0
|- bgcolor="#ccffcc"
| 3
| October 12
| @ Phoenix
| 
| Al Jefferson (16)
| Kyrylo Fesenko (6)
| Paul Millsap,Earl Watson,Ronnie Price,Gordon Hayward (3)
| US Airways Center12,410
| 3–0
|- bgcolor="#ccffcc"
| 4
| October 14
| Phoenix
| 
| Al Jefferson (24)
| Paul Millsap (7)
| Deron Williams (5)
| EnergySolutions Arena19,883
| 4–0
|- bgcolor="#ccffcc"
| 5
| October 16
| @ L.A. Clippers
| 
| C. J. Miles (20)
| Paul Millsap,Jeremy Evans (7)
| Ronnie Price (7)
| Staples Center18,997
| 5–0
|- bgcolor="#ccffcc"
| 6
| October 17
| @ L.A. Lakers
| 
| Gordon Hayward (26)
| Paul Millsap (7)
| Earl Watson (6)
| Staples Center15,690
| 6–0
|- bgcolor="#ccffcc"
| 7
| October 19
| @ L.A. Lakers
| 
| C. J. Miles (14)
| Al Jefferson (8)
| Deron Williams (5)
| Honda Center15,625
| 7–0
|- bgcolor="ccffcc"
| 8
| October 22
| Sacramento
| 
| Al Jefferson,Raja Bell,Kyrylo Fesenko (12)
| Andrei Kirilenko (7)
| Ronnie Price (8)
| EnergySolutions Arena19,505
| 8–0
|-

Regular season

Standings

Record vs. opponents

Game log

|- bgcolor="#ffcccc"
| 1
| October 27
| @ Denver
| 
| Deron Williams (17)
| Paul Millsap (8)
| Deron Williams (6)
| Pepsi Center19,155
| 0–1
|- bgcolor="#ffcccc"
| 2
| October 28                
| Phoenix
| 
| Al Jefferson (20)
| Paul Millsap (13)
| Deron Williams (6)
| EnergySolutions Arena19,911
| 0–2
|- bgcolor="#ccffcc"
| 3
| October 31
| @ Oklahoma City
| 
| Paul Millsap (30)
| Paul Millsap (16)
| Deron Williams (15)
| Oklahoma City Arena18,203
| 1–2
|-

|- bgcolor="#ccffcc"
| 4
| November 3
| Toronto
| 
| Al Jefferson (27)
| Deron Williams (8)
| Deron Williams (14)
| EnergySolutions Arena17,802
| 2–2
|- bgcolor="#ffcccc"
| 5
| November 5
| @ Golden State
| 
| Deron Williams (23)
| Al Jefferson (15)
| Deron Williams (6)
| Oracle Arena17,902
| 2–3
|- bgcolor="#ccffcc"
| 6
| November 6
| L.A. Clippers
| 
| Deron Williams (30)
| Paul Millsap (13)
| Deron Williams (7)
| EnergySolutions Arena19,911
| 3–3
|- bgcolor="#ccffcc"
| 7
| November 9
| @ Miami
| 
| Paul Millsap (46)
| Al Jefferson,Andrei Kirilenko,Paul Millsap (9)
| Deron Williams (14)
| American Airlines Arena19,600
| 4–3
|- bgcolor="#ccffcc"
| 8
| November 10
| @ Orlando
| 
| Deron Williams (30)
| Al Jefferson (8)
| Deron Williams (14)
| Amway Center18,846
| 5–3
|- bgcolor="#ccffcc"
| 9
| November 12
| @ Atlanta
| 
| Deron Williams (24)
| Andrei Kirilenko (12)
| Deron Williams (10)
| Philips Arena17,069
| 6–3
|- bgcolor="#ccffcc"
| 10
| November 13
| @ Charlotte
| 
| Al Jefferson (19)
| Andrei Kirilenko (7)
| Deron Williams (9)
| Time Warner Cable Arena15,486
| 7–3
|- bgcolor="#ffcccc"
| 11
| November 15
| Oklahoma City
| 
| Deron Williams (31)
| Paul Millsap,Francisco Elson (6)
| Deron Williams (11)
| EnergySolutions Arena19,911
| 7–4
|- bgcolor="#ccffcc"
| 12
| November 17
| New Jersey
| 
| Deron Williams (23)
| Paul Millsap (15)
| Deron Williams (8)
| EnergySolutions Arena19,314
| 8–4
|- bgcolor="#ffcccc"
| 13
| November 19
| San Antonio
| 
| Deron Williams (23)
| Paul Millsap (7)
| Andrei Kirilenko,Deron Williams (5)
| EnergySolutions Arena19,332
| 8–5
|- bgcolor="#ccffcc"
| 14
| November 20
| @ Portland
| 
| C. J. Miles (25)
| Al Jefferson (14)
| Deron Williams (11)
| Rose Garden20,533
| 9–5
|- bgcolor="#ccffcc"
| 15
| November 22
| Sacramento
| 
| C. J. Miles (20)
| Paul Millsap (9)
| Deron Williams (9)
| EnergySolutions Arena18,698
| 10–5
|- bgcolor="#ccffcc"
| 16
| November 24
| New Orleans
| 
| Deron Williams (26)
| Al Jefferson (10)
| Deron Williams (11)
| EnergySolutions Arena19,237
| 11–5
|- bgcolor="#ccffcc"
| 17
| November 26
| L.A. Lakers
| 
| Deron Williams (29)
| Al Jefferson,Paul Millsap (8)
| Deron Williams (12)
| EnergySolutions Arena19,911
| 12–5
|- bgcolor="#ccffcc"
| 18
| November 28
| @ L.A. Clippers
| 
| Deron Williams (26)
| Deron Williams (5)
| Deron Williams (9)
| Staples Center17,085
| 13–5
|- bgcolor="#ccffcc"
| 19
| November 29
| Milwaukee
| 
| Al Jefferson,Deron Williams (22)
| Al Jefferson (11)
| Deron Williams (10)
| EnergySolutions Arena18,497
| 14–5
|-

|- bgcolor="#ccffcc"
| 20
| December 1
| Indiana
| 
| Deron Williams (24)
| Al Jefferson (10)
| Deron Williams (16)
| EnergySolutions Arena18,732
| 15–5
|- bgcolor="#ffcccc"
| 21
| December 3
| Dallas
| 
| Paul Millsap (21)
| Al Jefferson (8)
| Deron Williams (7)
| EnergySolutions Arena19,623
| 15–6
|- bgcolor="#ccffcc"
| 22
| December 6
| Memphis
| 
| Deron Williams (27)
| Al Jefferson (10)
| Deron Williams (8)
| EnergySolutions Arena19,131
| 16–6
|- bgcolor="#ffcccc"
| 23
| December 8
| Miami
| 
| Al Jefferson (25)
| Al Jefferson (11)
| Deron Williams (12)
| EnergySolutions Arena19,911
| 16–7
|- bgcolor="#ccffcc"
| 24
| December 10
| Orlando
| 
| Deron Williams (32)
| Andrei Kirilenko (13)
| Deron Williams (9)
| EnergySolutions Arena18,765
| 17–7
|- bgcolor="#ffcccc"
| 25
| December 11
| @ Dallas
| 
| Deron Williams (34)
| Al Jefferson (9)
| Deron Williams (6)
| American Airlines Center20,074
| 17–8
|- bgcolor="#ccffcc"
| 26
| December 13
| Golden State
| 
| Deron Williams (30)
| Al Jefferson,Paul Millsap (8)
| Deron Williams (10)
| EnergySolutions Arena19,176
| 18–8
|- bgcolor="#ffcccc"
| 27
| December 17
| @ New Orleans
| 
| Paul Millsap (14)
| Paul Millsap (6)
| Deron Williams (5)
| New Orleans Arena14,414
| 18–9
|- bgcolor="#ccffcc"
| 28
| December 18
| @ Milwaukee
| 
| Deron Williams (22)
| Al Jefferson,Andrei Kirilenko,Paul Millsap (9)
| Deron Williams (11)
| Bradley Center16,004
| 19–9
|- bgcolor="#ccffcc"
| 29
| December 20
| @ Cleveland
| 
| C. J. Miles (22)
| Al Jefferson (13)
| Deron Williams (10)
| Quicken Loans Arena20,562
| 20–9
|- bgcolor="#ccffcc"
| 30
| December 22
| @ Minnesota
| 
| Deron Williams (25)
| Paul Millsap (11)
| Deron Williams (7)
| Target Center15,809
| 21–9
|- bgcolor="#ffcccc"
| 31
| December 27
| Portland
| 
| Deron Williams (31)
| Al Jefferson (9)
| Deron Williams (6)
| EnergySolutions Arena19,911
| 21–10
|- bgcolor="#ccffcc"
| 32
| December 29
| @ L.A. Clippers
| 
| Al Jefferson (31)
| Al Jefferson (10)
| Deron Williams (7)
| Staples Center19,060
| 22–10
|- bgcolor="#ffcccc"
| 33
| December 30
| @ Portland
| 
| Deron Williams (19)
| Al Jefferson (10)
| Deron Williams (8)
| Rose Garden20,652
| 22–11
|-

|- bgcolor="#ccffcc"
| 34
| January 1
| Memphis
| 
| Paul Millsap (22)
| Paul Millsap (10)
| Earl Watson (6)
| EnergySolutions Arena19,732
| 23–11
|- bgcolor="#ccffcc"
| 35
| January 3
| Detroit
| 
| Deron Williams (22)
| Paul Millsap (10)
| Deron Williams (10)
| EnergySolutions Arena19,911
| 24–11
|- bgcolor="#ffcccc"
| 36
| January 5
| Atlanta
| 
| Andrei Kirilenko,Deron Williams (19)
| Al Jefferson (7)
| Deron Williams (9)
| EnergySolutions Arena19,911
| 24–12
|- bgcolor="#ffcccc"
| 37
| January 7
| @ Memphis
| 
| Paul Millsap (20)
| Al Jefferson (13)
| Deron Williams (6)
| FedExForum14,781
| 24–13
|- bgcolor="#ccffcc"
| 38
| January 8
| @ Houston
| 
| Paul Millsap (27)
| Al Jefferson (13)
| Deron Williams (15)
| Toyota Center16,113
| 25–13
|- bgcolor="#ccffcc"
| 39
| January 12
| New York
| 
| C. J. Miles,Deron Williams (24)
| Paul Millsap (8)
| Deron Williams (12)
| EnergySolutions Arena19,911
| 26–13
|- bgcolor="#ccffcc"
| 40
| January 14
| Cleveland
| 
| Deron Williams (26)
| Al Jefferson,Mehmet Okur (7)
| Deron Williams (9)
| EnergySolutions Arena19,911
| 27–13
|- bgcolor="#ffcccc"
| 41
| January 17
| @ Washington
| 
| Deron Williams (28)
| Al Jefferson (10)
| Deron Williams (11)
| Verizon Center14,925
| 27–14
|- bgcolor="#ffcccc"
| 42
| January 19
| @ New Jersey
| 
| Al Jefferson (21)
| Al Jefferson,Andrei Kirilenko (8)
| Deron Williams (10)
| Prudential Center13,251
| 27–15
|- bgcolor="#ffcccc"
| 43
| January 21
| @ Boston
| 
| Earl Watson (12)
| Andrei Kirilenko (7)
| Deron Williams (6)
| TD Garden18,624
| 27–16
|- bgcolor="#ffcccc"
| 44
| January 22
| @ Philadelphia
| 
| Deron Williams (20)
| Al Jefferson (13)
| Deron Williams (14)
| Wells Fargo Center14,036
| 27–17
|- bgcolor="#ffcccc"
| 45
| January 25
| @ L.A. Lakers
| 
| Deron Williams (17)
| Al Jefferson (9)
| Deron Williams (8)
| Staples Center18,997
| 27–18
|- bgcolor="#ffcccc"
| 46
| January 26
| San Antonio
| 
| Deron Williams (39)
| Al Jefferson (9)
| Deron Williams (9)
| EnergySolutions Arena19,911
| 27–19
|- bgcolor="#ccffcc"
| 47
| January 28
| Minnesota
| 
| Paul Millsap (30)
| Al Jefferson (14)
| Earl Watson (13)
| EnergySolutions Arena19,911
| 28–19
|- bgcolor="#ffcccc"
| 48
| January 30
| @ Golden State
| 
| Al Jefferson (16)
| Al Jefferson (14)
| Paul Millsap (6)
| Oracle Arena18,187
| 28–20
|- bgcolor="#ccffcc"
| 49
| January 31
| Charlotte
| 
| Al Jefferson (21)
| Paul Millsap (12)
| Earl Watson (6)
| EnergySolutions Arena19,499
| 29–20
|-

|- bgcolor="#ffcccc"
| 50
| February 2
| Houston
| 
| Al Jefferson,Paul Millsap (20)
| Al Jefferson (12)
| Earl Watson (8)
| EnergySolutions Arena19,619
| 29–21
|- bgcolor="#ccffcc"
| 51
| February 4
| @ Denver
| 
| Al Jefferson (28)
| Al Jefferson (10)
| Deron Williams (12)
| Pepsi Center19,155
| 30–21
|- bgcolor="#ffcccc"
| 52
| February 5
| Oklahoma City
| 
| Paul Millsap (34)
| Paul Millsap (10)
| Deron Williams (11)
| EnergySolutions Arena19,711
| 30–22
|- bgcolor="#ccffcc"
| 53
| February 7
| @ Sacramento
| 
| Al Jefferson (23)
| Andrei Kirilenko (8)
| Deron Williams (9)
| ARCO Arena11,509
| 31–22
|- bgcolor="#ffcccc"
| 54
| February 9
| Chicago
| 
| Al Jefferson (26)
| Paul Millsap (14)
| Deron Williams (12)
| EnergySolutions Arena19,911
| 31–23
|- bgcolor="#ffcccc"
| 55
| February 11
| Phoenix
| 
| C. J. Miles,Deron Williams (19)
| Al Jefferson (12)
| Deron Williams (14)
| EnergySolutions Arena19,911
| 31–24
|- bgcolor="#ffcccc"
| 56
| February 15
| @ Phoenix
| 
| Al Jefferson (32)
| Al Jefferson (10)
| Deron Williams (11)
| US Airways Center16,874
| 31–25
|- bgcolor="#ffcccc"
| 57
| February 16
| Golden State
| 
| Al Jefferson (23)
| Al Jefferson (11)
| Deron Williams (11)
| EnergySolutions Arena19,911
| 31–26
|- align="center"
|colspan="9" bgcolor="#bbcaff"|All-Star Break
|- bgcolor="#ffcccc"
| 58
| February 23
| @ Dallas
| 
| Al Jefferson (30)
| Paul Millsap (9)
| Andrei Kirilenko,Earl Watson (5)
| American Airlines Center20,379
| 31–27
|- bgcolor="#ccffcc"
| 59
| February 25
| @ Indiana
| 
| Al Jefferson (30)
| Paul Millsap (18)
| Devin Harris (5)
| Conseco Fieldhouse16,205
| 32–27
|- bgcolor="#ffcccc"
| 60
| February 26
| @ Detroit
| 
| Paul Millsap (23)
| Paul Millsap (11)
| Devin Harris (12)
| The Palace of Auburn Hills18,564
| 32–28
|- bgcolor="#ffcccc"
| 61
| February 28
| Boston
| 
| Al Jefferson (28)
| Al Jefferson (19)
| Devin Harris (5)
| EnergySolutions Arena19,911
| 32–29
|-

|- bgcolor="#ffcccc"
| 62
| March 3
| Denver
| 
| C. J. Miles (22)
| Al Jefferson (10)
| Devin Harris (9)
| EnergySolutions Arena19,524
| 32–30
|- bgcolor="#ccffcc"
| 63
| March 5
| Sacramento
| 
| Al Jefferson (27)
| Francisco Elson (9)
| Devin Harris (7)
| EnergySolutions Arena19,911
| 33–30
|- bgcolor="#ffcccc"
| 64
| March 7
| @ New York
| 
| Al Jefferson (36)
| Al Jefferson (12)
| Earl Watson (8)
| Madison Square Garden19,763
| 33–31
|- bgcolor="#ccffcc"
| 65
| March 9
| @ Toronto
| 
| Al Jefferson (34)
| Al Jefferson (8)
| Devin Harris (5)
| Air Canada Centre14,425
| 34–31
|- bgcolor="#ffcccc"
| 66
| March 11
| @ Minnesota
| 
| Gordon Hayward (18)
| Al Jefferson (9)
| Earl Watson (9)
| Target Center18,534
| 34–32
|- bgcolor="#ffcccc"
| 67
| March 12
| @ Chicago
| 
| Al Jefferson (33)
| Al Jefferson (18)
| Raja Bell,Devin Harris,C. J. Miles,Earl Watson (3)
| United Center22,885
| 34–33
|- bgcolor="#ccffcc"
| 68
| March 14
| Philadelphia
| 
| Al Jefferson (30)
| Al Jefferson (17)
| Al Jefferson,Andrei Kirilenko (6)
| EnergySolutions Arena19,632
| 35–33
|- bgcolor="#ccffcc"
| 69
| March 16
| Minnesota
| 
| C. J. Miles (40)
| Al Jefferson (11)
| Earl Watson (8)
| EnergySolutions Arena19,465
| 36–33
|- bgcolor="#ffcccc"
| 70
| March 20
| @ Houston
| 
| Paul Millsap (35)
| Al Jefferson (19)
| Al Jefferson,Paul Millsap (4)
| Toyota Center14,459
| 36–34
|- bgcolor="#ffcccc"
| 71
| March 21
| @ Memphis
| 
| Paul Millsap (15)
| Jeremy Evans,Paul Millsap (6)
| Paul Millsap,Ronnie Price (4)
| FedExForum12,688
| 36–35
|- bgcolor="#ffcccc"
| 72
| March 23
| @ Oklahoma City
| 
| Al Jefferson (32)
| Al Jefferson (12)
| Raja Bell (4)
| Oklahoma City Arena18,203
| 36–36
|- bgcolor="#ffcccc"
| 73
| March 24
| New Orleans
| 
| Paul Millsap (33)
| Al Jefferson (13)
| Earl Watson (8)
| EnergySolutions Arena18,840
| 36–37
|- bgcolor="#ffcccc"
| 74
| March 26
| Dallas
| 
| Al Jefferson (21)
| Al Jefferson (7)
| Ronnie Price (6)
| EnergySolutions Arena19,649
| 36–38
|- bgcolor="#ffcccc"
| 75
| March 28
| Washington
| 
| C. J. Miles (17)
| Al Jefferson (16)
| Earl Watson (9)
| EnergySolutions Arena19,724
| 36–39
|-

|- bgcolor="#ffcccc"
| 76
| April 1
| L.A. Lakers
| 
| C. J. Miles (24)
| Al Jefferson (10)
| Al Jefferson (5)
| EnergySolutions Arena19,911
| 36–40
|- bgcolor="#ffcccc"
| 77
| April 3
| @ Sacramento
| 
| Paul Millsap (21)
| Al Jefferson (9)
| Earl Watson (8)
| Power Balance Pavilion17,215
| 36–41
|- bgcolor="#ccffcc"
| 78
| April 5
| @ L.A. Lakers
| 
| Gordon Hayward,Paul Millsap (22)
| Derrick Favors,Al Jefferson (11)
| Earl Watson (6)
| Staples Center18,997
| 37–41
|- bgcolor="#ffcccc"
| 79
| April 7
| Portland
| 
| Devin Harris (26)
| Al Jefferson (14)
| Devin Harris,Al Jefferson (5)
| EnergySolutions Arena18,831
| 37–42
|- bgcolor="#ffcccc"
| 80
| April 9
| @ San Antonio
| 
| Al Jefferson (23)
| Al Jefferson (8)
| Devin Harris (9)
| AT&T Center18,802
| 37–43
|- bgcolor="#ccffcc"
| 81
| April 11
| @ New Orleans
| 
| Devin Harris,C. J. Miles (18)
| Al Jefferson,Paul Millsap (6)
| Devin Harris,Al Jefferson,C. J. Miles (5)
| New Orleans Arena12,558
| 38–43
|- bgcolor="#ccffcc"
| 82
| April 13
| Denver
| 
| Gordon Hayward (34)
| Al Jefferson (10)
| Devin Harris (6)
| EnergySolutions Arena19,051
| 39–43
|-

Player statistics

Season

Awards, records and milestones

Awards

Week/Month
 On November 15, Deron Williams was named Western Conference Player of the Week (November 8–November 14).

All-Star

Season

Records

Milestones

Transactions

Trades

Free agents

Additions

Subtractions

|}

References

Utah Jazz seasons
Utah
Utah
Utah